U.S. Route 15 (US 15) is a -long United States highway, designated along South Carolina, North Carolina, Virginia, Maryland, Pennsylvania, and New York. The route is signed north–south, from U.S. Route 17 Alternate in Walterboro, South Carolina to NY 17 in Corning, New York.

US 15 is one of the original United States Highways from 1926.

Route description

|-
|SC
|158.58
|255.21
|-
|NC
|158.13
|254.48
|-
|VA
|229.73
|369.71
|-
|MD
|37.92
|61.02
|-
|PA
|194.89
|313.64
|-
|NY
|12.46
|20.05
|-
|Total
|791.71
|1,274.13
|}

South Carolina

Starting at ALT US 17 in Walterboro US 15 goes east, running  parallel to I-95 and across I-26. Then it turns north and crosses I-95. Just before the town of Santee US 15 converges with US 301. In Santee, the two highways merge with I-95 at exit 98 and all three cross Lake Marion. At exit 102, US 15/301 split off from Interstate 95 and go into the town of Summerton. US 15 then separates from US 301 and heads mainly north to city of Sumter. From there it continues north, crosses I-20, goes through the cities of Bishopville and Hartsville to the town of Society Hill. It is here that US 401 joins US 15 and both go to the North Carolina border.

North Carolina

US 15-401 continues to Laurinburg, at which US 401 splits off and US 15 runs concurrent with US 501. US 1 briefly merges with US 15-501 through Aberdeen and Sanford. The route continues north of Sanford with NC 87 towards Pittsboro. Past Pittsboro, US 15-501 goes toward Chapel Hill and skirts around the southeastern edge of the city and then across I-40 to Durham. (Prior to the construction of the Chapel Hill bypass, US 15 ran through Chapel Hill, and as of 2018 there is a "Jefferson Davis Highway" marker on Franklin Street, Chapel Hill's main street.) Here US 15-501 splits into Business and Bypass routes. Before US 15 Business and Bypass highways rejoin on the other side of Durham, I-85 merges into US 15 Business. Then I-85/US 15 go north. Right after crossing Falls Lake at exit 186, US 15 splits off to the east. US 15 runs parallel to I-85, going through the city of Creedmoor. It then crosses back over I-85, goes through the city of Oxford, on through Bullock, and then to the N.C.-Virginia state line.

Virginia

Virginia's section of US 15 starts in Mecklenburg County. Not far from the state line, it crosses a narrow finger of the John H. Kerr Reservoir. The highway goes through the town of Clarksville and merges very briefly with US 58/VA 49 and then crosses over the main body of Lake Kerr. US 15 continues a little ways and merges with US 360. The two highways go on to the town of Keysville. After Keysville, US 15 branches off and goes to the town of Farmville. After a brief merge with US 460, US 15 goes through the towns of Dillwyn, New Canton (on the James River), Fork Union, and Palmyra before crossing I-64 at Zion Crossroads. After passing the interstate, US 15 goes through the towns of Gordonsville (with a quick merge with US 33) and Orange, and then on to Culpeper. After Culpeper US 15 runs concurrent with US 29.  In Warrenton they briefly merge with US 17. South of Gainesville US 15 breaks off and crosses I-66. From there it goes on to Leesburg and then to the state line.

Maryland

US 15 starts in Maryland at Point of Rocks, crossing the Potomac River and then merges into US 340 just south of Frederick. In Frederick, US 40 merges with US 15 for a very short distance. From there US 15 goes through Thurmont and on to the Maryland/Pennsylvania border.

Pennsylvania and New York

US 15 enters Pennsylvania south of Gettysburg.  Business Route 15 (Emmitsburg Road) goes through Gettysburg, while US 15 bypasses the borough; the bypass continues to York Springs.  US 15 passes through Dillsburg before becoming a freeway near Grantham and the Messiah University campus.

US 15 continues as a freeway until it intersects U.S. Route 11 and Pennsylvania Route 581 in Camp Hill.  US 15 runs concurrent with US 11, passing Harrisburg on the west shore of the Susquehanna River. The concurrency ends at Shamokin Dam, where US 11 splits and follows the North Branch Susquehanna River, and US 15 follows the West Branch Susquehanna River north towards Williamsport where it passes through Lewisburg and the campus of Bucknell University (which is partially bisected by the highway).  In the future, US 15 and US 11 will diverge in Selinsgrove, Pennsylvania, from which US 15 will proceed north on a road yet to be built, and connect back to its current alignment near Winfield, PA. 11 will be joined to a business loop of 15 instead of the main route.

The segment from Williamsport, Pennsylvania to the northern terminus at I-86 and NY 17 in Painted Post, New York has been completely upgraded to Interstate standards, except for one access road at Mile Marker 150.1, in preparation for the eventual transition to designation as I-99, as has the US 15/I-86 interchange. The  segment of US 15 in New York runs parallel to the Tioga River from the state line to its current northern terminus at I-86 and NY 17 exit 44 at the junction of the Tioga and Cohocton rivers in Painted Post, west of downtown Corning.  The entire length of US 15 in New York is signed concurrently with I-99.

History
Until 1974, US 15 continued north of NY 17 and entered Painted Post on North Hamilton Street. At what is now the junction of Steuben County Route 41 and New York State Route 415 in downtown Painted Post, US 15 turned north onto NY 415. At the northern terminus of NY 415, located at NY 15 and New York State Route 21 south of Wayland, US 15 followed the current routing of NY 15 into downtown Rochester, where it terminated at New York State Route 31.

US 15 has shed considerable length in near-continuous realignment and regrading over the years.  Prior to the completion of the Tioga Creek flood-control project, hastened by the flooding caused after Hurricane Agnes along the Pennsylvania and New York segments of US 15 in June 1972, US 15 passed through many small towns in Pennsylvania as it passed from Lawrenceville, at the New York border, to West Milton, where the road begins to follow the west bank of the Susquehanna River.  Originally a winding two-lane road over numerous mountains, 15 now bypasses many small towns such as Sebring, Blossburg, Covington, Canoe Camp and Hepburnville.  In the 1970s, the challenging two-lane alignment was expanded in some areas to four lanes by building a second set of lanes.  Now, for some stretches, the "old" road is the northbound side and in other sections, the southbound side.

Near Mansfield, Pennsylvania, the old Route 15 alignment is now a  access road leading to a boat ramp, built where the old road now disappears into the Tioga Reservoir.  Near Tioga, Pennsylvania, drivers crossing the tall concrete bridge can see where a two-lane road (formerly Route 15), still marked with double yellow lines, disappears into the water.

Scenic Byway
In October 2009, a  portion of US 15 from Charlottesville, VA to Gettysburg, PA was designated a National Scenic Byway by the U.S. Secretary of Transportation. The byway will be known as the Journey Through Hallowed Ground. With this designation, the route and historic sites along the route are now eligible for preservation grants.

Major intersections
South Carolina
 in Walterboro
 in St. George
 in Rosinville
 north-northeast of Rosinville
 in Wells
 south-southeast of Dantzler
 southwest of Santee. The highways travel concurrently to Summerton.
 southeast of Santee. The highways travel concurrently to Adams Landing.
 in South Sumter. 
 in Sumter
 on the Sumter–Mulberry city line
 southwest of Bishopville
 southwest of Society Hill. US 15/US 52 travel concurrently to Society Hill. US 15/US 401 travel concurrently to Laurinburg, North Carolina.
North Carolina
 in Laurinburg. US 15/US 501 travel concurrently to Durham.
 in Aberdeen. The highways travel concurrently through the city.
 south of Sanford. The highways travel concurrently to Sanford.
 in Sanford
 in Pittsboro
 in Durham
 in Durham. I-85/US 15 travel concurrently to Dutchville Township. US 15/US 70 travel concurrently through the city.
 south-southwest of Oxford
 in Oxford
Virginia
 in Clarksville
 in Clarksville
 north-northeast of Wylliesburg. The highways travel concurrently to north of Keysville.
 south of Farmville. The highways travel concurrently to west of Farmville.
 in Sprouses Corner
 in Zion Crossroads
 north-northeast of Zion Crossroads
 south of Gordonsville. The highways travel concurrently to Gordonsville.
 south of Culpeper. The highways travel concurrently to Gainesville.
 southeast of Culpeper
 in Opal. The highways travel concurrently to Warrenton.
 in Haymarket
 in Gilberts Corner
Maryland
 east of Jefferson.
 in Ballenger Creek
 in Frederick. US 15/US 40 travel concurrently through the city.
Pennsylvania
 in Straban Township
 in Upper Allen Township
 in Camp Hill. The highways travel concurrently to Shamokin Dam.
 in Summerdale
 in Penn Township
 in Monroe Township
 in White Deer Township
 in Williamsport. The highways travel concurrently through the city.
 in Williamsport. I-99/US 15 will travel concurrently to Erwin, New York.
 in Mansfield
New York
 at the New York–Pennsylvania border.  The highways travel concurrently to Erwin.
 in Erwin

References

External links

Photographs of U.S. Route 15 in North Central Pennsylvania - John Walter
Journey Through Hallowed Ground, a National Park Service Discover Our Shared Heritage Travel Itinerary
Endpoints of U.S. Highway 15

 
15
Interstate 95